The following is a timeline of the history of Saratoga Springs, New York, USA

Prior to 19th century 
 1643 – Father Isaac Jogues reported to have visited the springs for which the city would be so named.
 1691 – English settlers build Fort Saratoga.
 1767 – William Johnson, a British soldier and hero of the French and Indian Wars, is treated by Native Americans for his war wounds at springs  outside of the village (now known as High Rock Spring).
 1775 – The first European-American settler, Dirck Shouten, builds a dwelling near the High Rock Spring. However, he is later forced to relocate on warnings from the Native Americans to stay away from the spring.
 1777 – The Battles of Saratoga are fought nearby in the Town of Stillwater.
 1783 – George Washington attempts to purchase the High Rock Spring and others.
 1789 – Gideon Putnam builds the first hotel for travelers.

19th century 
1802 – Gideon Putnam constructs the Union Hall hotel near the Congress Spring.
1810 - Population: 1,909.
1811 – Putnam dies of injuries sustained during construction of Congress Hall.
1819 – The Town of Saratoga Spring established; set off from a western portion of the Town of Saratoga.
1824 – The first United States Hotel is built.
1826 – Principal community incorporated as the Village of Saratoga Springs.
1833 - Saratoga and Schenectady Railroad opens for service with steam powered trains.
1853 - Potato chips are created by George Crum at Moon's Lakehouse
1855 - The Saratogian begins publication.
1863 – Saratoga Race Course opens.

20th century 
 1902 - The Adirondack Trust Company is founded.
 1903 – Lucy Ann Skidmore founds the Young Woman's Industrial Club.
 1911 – The YWIC is chartered as the Skidmore School of Arts.
 1913 - Congress Park in its present incarnation is created.
 1915
 April 7: The City of Saratoga Springs is incorporated by charter.
 June 8: Walter P. Butler is elected the city's first mayor.
 June 26: The Spencer Trask memorial, The Spirit of Life, is dedicated at Congress Park.
 1917 - St. Clements Roman Catholic Church is consecrated, and holds its first Mass.
 1918 - Harry Pettee elected mayor
 1919 - James D. McNulty elected mayor
 1922 – Skidmore College founded.
 1923 - Humorist Clarence Knapp elected mayor.
 1926 - Yaddo established as an artists' retreat.
 1927 - William Eddy elected mayor.
 1928 - Population: 14,000.
 1935 - Addison Mallery elected mayor; he would become the longest-serving mayor in the city's history.
 1937 - Saratoga released.
 1941 - June 26: The Saratoga Raceway opens.
 1945
 The second Stewart's Shops opens in Saratoga Springs, following the opening of the first shop in nearby Ballston Spa.
 The United States Hotel on the corner of Broadway and Division Street is razed.
 1946 - Racing resumes at the Saratoga Race Course after three years due to wartime rationing; during that time, all Saratoga races were run at Belmont Park.
 1950
 August 1: The National Racing Museum and Hall of Fame opens at the Canfield Casino.
 The Saratoga Springs Public Library opens on the corner of Broadway and Spring Street near Congress Park.
 1952 - Demolition of the Grand Union Hotel begins
 1953 - Meyer Lansky serves his only prison sentence: three months in the Saratoga County Jail for gambling at the Arrowhead Inn.
 1955 - The National Museum and Racing Hall of Fame relocates to its current location on Union Avenue, near the Saratoga Race Course.
 1957 - A block of buildings on Broadway is destroyed in a massive fire; one police officer is killed.
 1959 - November 3: James E. Benton elected mayor.
 1960 – May 20: Caffè Lena opens for the first time.
 1961
 The Saratoga Springs train station opens at its current location off West Avenue.
 June: Bob Dylan first performs at Caffè Lena.
 October 28: Skidmore College acquires the  Jonsson Campus in the former Woodlawn Park.
 1963
 Saratoga Race Course celebrates its centennial.
 July 19 – The section of Interstate 87 (the Adirondack Northway) in Saratoga between Exits 14 and 15 is completed.
 November 5: Arthur J. Kearney elected mayor.
 1964 - December 4: Ice storm hits Saratoga Springs
 1965
 November 2 - James A. Murphy elected mayor.
 November 9 - Saratoga Springs loses electrical power as a result of the Northeast blackout of 1965. 
 November 14 – Convention Hall on Broadway near Congress Park destroyed in fire.
 1966
 Skidmore College opens its first buildings on the uptown Jonsson Campus off North Broadway; the move would take seven years to reach completion.
 July 8: Saratoga Performing Arts Center (SPAC) opens with a performance of Shakespeare's A Midsummer Night's Dream.
 1969
 Saratoga Springs High School relocated to present location between West Avenue and West Circular Street; former site becomes Lake Avenue Elementary School
 November 4: Sarto Smaldone, owner of the Malta Drive-In, elected mayor.
 1970 - The Tin & Lint opens on 2 Caroline Street as "The Bar With No Name".
 1973 - November 6: Raymond Watkin elected mayor.
 1977 - January 7: The Saratoga Springs Preservation Foundation is founded.
 1979 - November 6: Ellsworth Jones elected mayor; serves in that post for the entire 1980s.
 1984 - August 2: Saratoga Springs City Center opens.
 1985 - Home Made Theater stages its first performance at the Spa Little Theater: Wait Until Dark
 1986
 The National Museum of Dance and Hall of Fame opens
 First running of the Head of the Fish regatta at Saratoga Lake
 1987 - Kayderosseras Park closes
 1989 - November 7: Almeda C. Dake elected mayor; first female mayor in the city's history.
 1990 - Population: 25,001.
 1995
 The Saratoga Springs Public Library relocates to its current location on Henry Street.
 November 7: J. Michael O'Connell elected mayor.
 1996 - December 31: Saratoga hosts its first ever "First Night" New Year's Eve celebrations.
 1997 - The Pfeil Building opens on Broadway; the mixed-use building is the first to open on Broadway in 50 years.
 1999 - November 2: Kenneth Klotz elected mayor

21st century 
 2000
 Population: 26,186.
 The Frances Young Tang Teaching Museum and Art Gallery opens on the Skidmore College campus.
 2001 : The Lake Avenue armory becomes home to the New York State Military Museum.
 2002
 June: The carousel formerly at Kayderosseras Park reopens in Congress Park.
 June: The Saratoga Automobile Museum opens at Saratoga Spa State Park.
 Fiberglass painted horses appear at various locations downtown.
 2003
 August 14: Saratoga Springs is involved in another major blackout.
 November 4: Michael Lenz, former Commissioner of Finance, elected mayor.
 2004 - January 28: Saratoga Gaming and Raceway opens.
 2005 - November 8: Valerie M. Keehn elected mayor.
 2007
 The Ellsworth Ice Cream plant closes after 74 years of operation.
 November 6: Scott Johnson elected mayor.
 2010 
 Population: 26,586.
 February 5: The Arthur Zankel Music Center opens on the Skidmore campus.
 2011
 Saratoga Gaming and Raceway becomes Saratoga Casino and Raceway.
 August 28: Three-quarters of Saratoga Springs loses electricity and the card at Saratoga Race Course is cancelled during Hurricane Irene.
 2012
 July 24: The city's memorial to the September 11 attacks is sited and dedicated at High Rock Park.
 Market Center Apartments opens on Railroad Place between Division and Church Streets.
 New parking garage opens on Woodlawn Avenue.
 2013
 Saratoga Race Course celebrates its 150th anniversary.
 November 5: Joanne Dittes Yepsen elected mayor.
 2014
 August 31: Tom Durkin calls his last race at Saratoga Race Course after 24 years.
 2015
 Saratoga Springs celebrates the centennial of its city charter.
 Centennial Park and Saratoga Waterfront Park dedicated.
 June 26: The Spirit of Life statue in Congress Park is renovated.
 Fall: The High Rock Spring is re-recognized as the origin of the city.
 2016
 Summer: SPAC celebrates its fiftieth anniversary.
 2017
 November 7: Megan Kelly elected mayor.
2018
August 17: City Hall catches fire after lightning strikes the building
September 3: Sam "The Bugler" Grossman retires after 25 years at the track.

See also
 Timelines of other cities in New York state: Buffalo, New York City (also Bronx, Brooklyn, Queens)

References

Further reading 
 Published in the 19th century
 
 

Published in the 20th century
 

Published in the 21st century
 
 
 

Saratoga Springs, New York
History of New York (state)
S